Chinmaya Vidyalayas are a group of schools operated by the Central Chinmaya Mission Trust (CCMT), founded by Swami Chinmayananda and currently headed by Swami Tejomayananda.There are more than 80 Chinmaya Vidyalayas across 12 states in India and one in Trinidad. They emphasise the learning of scriptures.

CCMT Education Cell
The CCMT(Central Chinmaya Mission Trust) Education Cell is the governing body of the Chinmaya Education Movement. It is headquartered at 'Chinmaya Gardens' in Coimbatore, India. It was created to monitor, integrate, streamline, upgrade, standardise, and facilitate the efficient and effective maintenance and growth of all Chinmaya Educational Institutions.

History

Founding

Swami Chinmayananda was on his first global tour. The queen of Vengunad, Radha Devi, was the president of Chinmaya Mission, Kollengode in Kerala. There was a request to start a school.

A part of the palace was offered and so the Chinmaya Education Movement (CEM) was started with the inauguration of a nursery school on 20 May 1965, with royal patronage by Shri KPS Menon (ex-ambassador to Russia). The Chinmaya nursery school grew and Swami Chinmayananda inaugurated the primary school on 17 June 1969, in a separate building near the palace. It has over time become a higher secondary school, with 555 students, a staff of 37, and structure and infrastructure.

Growth over the years

In 1966, Swami Chinmayananda first mentioned in a casual conversation that Chennai should have a Chinmaya Vidyalaya; the first of the seven Chinmaya Vidyalayas was inaugurated in October 1968 by the famous Bharatanatyam dancer Rukmini Devi Arundale. These Vidyalayas are considered amongst the best in this metropolitan city and are headed by Swami Tejomayananda who succeeded Swami Chinmayananda as the chancellor for all the Vidyalayas across Chennai and later India.

In the next 25 years (between mid-60 to 1980), 24 more Vidyalayas were established all over India, with 11 in Kerala, five Tamil Nadu, two each in Karnataka, Jharkhand and Odisha, one in Andhra Pradesh, and one in the metropolitan city of New Delhi.

Constructed in 1979, CV Delhi educated its first students in a small building, shifting later to its present site of nearly four acres in the sophisticated South Delhi suburb of Vasant Vihar. Swami Jyotirmayananda of Chinmaya Mission Delhi brought together man and material and forded through the political corridors of Delhi to give concrete shape to this Chinmaya Vidyalaya.

Between the years 1980 to 2013, more than 50 Vidyalayas were set up all over India. A notable one is the Chinmaya Hari Har Vidyalaya, Ellayapalle, in Andhra Pradesh. Started by Swamini Sharadapriyananda (a dynamic lawyer, Gandhian, and freedom-fighter turned  and one of the senior-most disciples of Swami Chinmayananda) her passion was to serve the poorest of poor, giving them material succor and spiritual solace. As of 2012 there were over 80 Chinmaya Vidyalayas with over 75,000 students all over India.

In Trinidad

Swami Chinmayananda first visited Trinidad in May 1965. A Chinmaya Mission centre was established by Swami Prakashananda (a native of Trinidad) in 1997. The first Chinmaya Vidyalaya outside India was inaugurated in 2003.

Notes

External links
Chinmaya Vidyalaya, Rajalapalayam
Schools and Colleges of Chinmaya Mission
Chinmaya Vidyalaya Nauni
Chinmaya Vidyalaya, Kunnumpuram, Thiruvananthapuram

Private schools in Tamil Nadu
Educational organisations based in India
1965 establishments in Madras State
Educational institutions established in 1965
Co-educational schools in India
Schools affiliated with the Chinmaya Mission